Let's Get Lost is a 1997 Danish film written and directed by Jonas Elmer and produced by Per Holst. The film is an improvisational slice-of-life comedy shot in black and white. The film earned the 1998 Bodil Award for Best Danish Film and shared the Robert Award for Best Danish Film with Barbara.

Plot 
Julie has been abandoned by her boyfriend and seeks revenge. Mogens borrowed her sofa for a weekend but has been living there for the past 13 years. He aspires to become a composer but is living on welfare. Thomas wants to become a writer but is still struggling with his first chapter and works as a hospital porter. Steffen is deceiving the unemployment insurance system. The three daydreaming young men are occupying Julie's apartment while enjoying beer, television and football.

Cast

Production 
The film was produced by Dansk Novellefilm and Per Holst Filmproduktion. Elmer's script was only an outline which required the actors to improvise their roles and dialogue.

Sidse Babett Knudsen made her film debut in the lead role of the character, Julie. Knudsen said she was not very good at improvisation and accepted the part only because she thought it would be a lightweight summer comedy.

Reception 
The film became a breakout hit in Denmark and Knudsen received both the Robert Award and the Bodil Award for Best Actress. Critics called Knudsen's performance dominating. Film critic Kim Skotte of Politiken wrote that Knudsen had hit a new tone with a "special ability to capture the modern woman's uncertainty and strength."

The film earned the 1998 Bodil Award for Best Danish Film and shared the Robert Award for Best Danish Film with Barbara.

Notes

References

External links 
 
 

1997 comedy films
1997 films
Best Danish Film Bodil Award winners
Best Danish Film Robert Award winners
Danish comedy films
Films directed by Jonas Elmer (director)
1990s Danish-language films
1997 directorial debut films